Raffaele Cecco, born 10 May 1967, is a British video games developer who has created numerous video games since 1984, including Cybernoid and Exolon. He grew up in Tottenham in North London. Spurred by an interest in computers, he received his first computer, a Sinclair ZX81, as a birthday gift from his parents in 1981 and began programming simple games in BASIC.

Due to the popularity of Cecco's video games he was asked to write a monthly diary for CRASH magazine, the first installment being 15 April 1988. The diary documented the development of Stormlord.

Partial list of games 
These are games that Cecco has developed or been closely associated with.

Equinox (1986, Mikro-Gen)
Exolon (1987, Hewson Consultants)
Cybernoid (1988, Hewson Consultants)
Stormlord (1989, Hewson Consultants)
Deliverance: Stormlord II (1990, Hewson Consultants)
First Samurai (1991, Vivid Image)
Second Samurai (1993, Vivid Image)
Street Racer (1994, Vivid Image)
Agent Armstrong (1997, King of the Jungle)
Invasion From Beyond (1998, King of the Jungle)
Galaga: Destination Earth (2000, King of the Jungle)
Championship Manager Quiz (2001, King of the Jungle)
Grooverider: Slot Car Thunder (2003, King of the Jungle)

A compilation of his games, Cecco's Collection, was released by Hewson in 1990, and included Exolon, Cybernoid, Cybernoid II, and Stormlord. Your Sinclair awarded this compilation 92%, describing it as a fine three-year collection of Cecco's achievements and a succinct history of Spectrum programming to that date. The reviewer, Andy Ide, also considered Cecco as one of the Spectrum's biggest stars.

References

External links
 CRASH issue 59 at CRASH Online; Programmers on Programmers article
  Amstrad Cent pour Cent issue 14; an interview

1967 births
British video game designers
British video game programmers
Living people